Ariane Friedrich (born Tempel; 10 January 1984 in Nordhausen) is a German high jumper. She won the silver medal at the 2009 World Championships and represented Germany at the 2008 Summer Olympics and 2012 Summer Olympics. She is the German outdoor record holder in the event with a best of 2.06 m, although this is 1 cm less than the indoor record held by Heike Henkel.

She became German champion in 2004, 2007, 2008, 2009 and 2010, and represents the club LG Eintracht Frankfurt.

Controversy arose in 2012 when she named an alleged stalker on Facebook, potentially violating German privacy laws.

Career
Friedrich won the gold medal at the 2003 European Junior Championships, the bronze medal at the 2005 Summer Universiade, silver at the 2007 Summer Universiade and the gold medal at the 2009 Summer Universiade.

The 2008 indoor season saw significant improvement in Friedrich's clearances: she improved her best by 8 cm during the period, clearing two metres for the first time and setting her top mark at 2.02 m. Her coach noted that these achievements were due to her improved work ethic and focus. She finished eighth at the 2008 World Indoor Championships and took seventh in the high jump final at the 2008 Beijing Olympics.

Her 2009 indoor season started strongly with a win at the 2009 European Athletics Indoor Championships in a jump of 2.01 m. Her outdoor season started with a personal best jump of 2.06 metres in June 2009 at the Internationales Stadionfest, breaking Heike Henkel's outdoor national record of 2.05 m,  and she won another gold at the 2009 European Team Championships later that month. She gained a complete set of Universiade medals in July when she finally won the gold at the 2009 Summer Universiade.

Ariane Friedrich won the bronze medal at the 2009 World Championships in Athletics in Berlin. She reflected that the public pressure for her to become world champion had placed her under much stress. However, she was very happy at having achieved a jump of 2.02 m for third place behind Blanka Vlašić and Anna Chicherova. Friedrich missed the 2010 IAAF World Indoor Championships due to a knee injury and instead set her sights on medalling at the 2010 European Athletics Championships. She jumped 2.01 m at the European Championships in Barcelona, but she was beaten by Vlašić (who equalled the championship record) and also by Emma Green on count-back, leaving her with the bronze medal. She became the first German woman to win at the Internationales Hochsprung-Meeting Eberstadt a month later.

On December 22, 2010 she ruptured her left Achilles tendon during training and was ruled out of the entire 2011 season including the World Championships in Daegu.

She failed to make the final at the 2012 London Olympic Games, finishing 14th in the Qualifying Rounds.
In September 2014, she gave birth to a baby girl. She came back to the competition in January 2016, after almost four years. She jumped for her first competition 1,87 m.

Personal bests

All information taken from IAAF profile.

Competition record

Results with a Q, indicate overall position in qualifying round.

See also
Female two metres club

References

External links 

 
 
 
 
 
 
 
 

1984 births
Living people
People from Nordhausen, Thuringia
Sportspeople from Thuringia
German female high jumpers
German national athletics champions
Athletes (track and field) at the 2008 Summer Olympics
Olympic athletes of Germany
Athletes (track and field) at the 2012 Summer Olympics
World Athletics Championships medalists
European Athletics Championships medalists
Universiade medalists in athletics (track and field)
Universiade gold medalists for Germany
Universiade silver medalists for Germany
Universiade bronze medalists for Germany
Medalists at the 2009 Summer Universiade
Medalists at the 2005 Summer Universiade
Medalists at the 2007 Summer Universiade